May or Mae Clark(e) may refer to:

May Clark (1885–1971), English silent film actress
Mae Clarke (1897–1982), American film and TV actress

See also
May Herschel-Clarke (1850–1950), English poet
Clarke (surname)